Ilia is a commune in Hunedoara County, Romania. The commune lies in the historical province of Transylvania. It is composed of nine villages: Bacea (Bácsfalva), Bretea Mureșană (Marosbrettye), Brâznic (Briznik), Cuieș (Kulyes), Dumbrăvița (Dumbravica), Ilia, Săcămaș (Szakamás), Sârbi (Szirb) and Valea Lungă (Valealunga).

Notable people 
 Gabriel Bethlen (1580 in Marosillye – 1629), Prince of Transylvania from 1613 to 1629.

References

Communes in Hunedoara County
Localities in Transylvania